The term Eparchy of Mukachevo (also: Mukacheve, Mukačevo, Mukaczewo, Mukachiv, Munkács, Munkatsch) may refer to:

 Eastern Orthodox Eparchy of Mukachevo, former Eastern Orthodox diocese that existed until the Union of Uzhhorod in 17th century.
 Greek Catholic Eparchy of Mukachevo, current Eastern Catholic diocese that was formed after the Union of Uzhhorod.
 Eparchy of Mukachevo and Prešov, former Eastern Orthodox diocese that existed from 1931 to 1945, under ecclesiastical jurisdiction of the Serbian Orthodox Church.
 Eparchy of Mukachevo and Uzhhorod, modern Eastern Orthodox diocese that exists from 1945, under ecclesiastical jurisdiction of the Ukrainian Orthodox Church (Moscow Patriarchate).

See also
 Mukachevo
 Roman Catholic Diocese of Mukachevo
 Czech and Slovak Orthodox Church